Hallowe'en is a short animated film distributed by RKO Radio Pictures, and stars Toby the Pup. The film is the third-to-last cartoon in the series.

Plot
At a Halloween costume party, a jolly Toby dances around. He kisses several girls but each reacts with dismay and runs away. Tessie confronts Toby, who kisses her a few times and she slaps him. She then complains to Toby about trying to spoil her party, and threatens to tell his mother about it. To placate her, Toby offers to play the piano. He plays while the other guests listen, including a goat who eats various household objects, including the piano keys. A church bell chimes and Toby warns everyone that this is the witching hour.

Meanwhile, a witch and various supernatural creatures are flying above. They fall through the chimney and frighten the party guests. Toby fights with several ghosts.  When a number of ghosts surround him, he emulates a rooster's crow which frightens the ghosts and they flee. Toby and Tessie notice an egg on the floor which hatches into a small ghost who calls Toby "daddy".

External links
 Halloween at the Big Cartoon Database

1931 animated films
American black-and-white films
1931 comedy films
1931 films
Films about dogs
American films about Halloween
American monster movies
American animated short films
1931 short films
1930s English-language films
1930s American films